Cosmos generally refers to an orderly or harmonious system.

Cosmos or Kosmos may also refer to:

Space
 Cosmos 1, a privately funded solar sail spacecraft project
 Cosmic Evolution Survey (COSMOS), a Hubble Space Telescope Treasury Project
 Kosmos (rocket family), a series of Soviet/Russian rockets
 Kosmos (satellite), a series of Soviet/Russian satellites
 Universe, synonymous with cosmos

Places
 Cosmos, Minnesota, United States
 Cosmos, Rio de Janeiro, a neighborhood of Rio de Janeiro, Brazil
 Kosmos, North West, South Africa
 Kosmos, Washington, an unincorporated community in Washington, United States

Books
 Cosmos (serial novel), a 17-chapter serial novel published in Science Fiction Digest (later Fantasy Magazine) in 1933 - 1934
 Cosmos (Gombrowicz novel), a 1965 novel by Witold Gombrowicz
 Cosmos (Sagan book), a 1980 book by Carl Sagan based on the documentary series
 Cosmos (Humboldt), a scientific treatise by Alexander von Humboldt
 The Kosmos Trilogy, a series of philosophy books by Ken Wilber

Journals

 Cosmos (Australian magazine), an Australian popular science magazine
 COSMOS (journal), the scientific journal of the Singapore National Academy of Science
 Cosmos: A Journal of Emerging Issues, an annual essay collection published by the Cosmos Club, 1990–2004
 Cosmos. Problems of Biological Sciences (originally Kosmos. Problemy Nauk Biologicznych), the scientific journal of the Polish Copernicus Society of Naturalists
 Cosmos Science Fiction and Fantasy, a four-isuue science fiction magazine edited by David G. Hartwell in 1977

Comics
 Cosmo, a Fairy Godparent from The Fairly OddParents animated series
 Cosmo, a plant character from the Sonic X animated series
 COSMOS (Spriggan), an organization in the anime Spriggan
 Cosmos (Transformers)
 Cosmos, a character and deity in the video game Dissidia Final Fantasy (2008)
 Cosmos, a supercomputer in the book George's Secret Key to the Universe (2007)
 Kosmos (Marvel Comics)
 KOS-MOS, a Xenosaga character
 Sailor Cosmos, a Sailor Moon character

Film and TV

Films
 Cosmos (1996 film), a Canadian film
 Cosmos (2010 film), a Turkish film
 Cosmos (2015 film), a French film directed by Andrzej Żuławski, based on the novel by Gombrowicz
 Cosmos (2019 film), a British film

Television
 Cosmos: A Personal Voyage (1980), a 13-part documentary television series presented by Carl Sagan
 Cosmos: A Spacetime Odyssey (2014), a sequel to Cosmos: A Personal Voyage presented by Neil deGrasse Tyson 
 Cosmos: Possible Worlds (2020), a sequel to Cosmos: A Spacetime Odyssey presented by Neil deGrasse Tyson 
 PLP (TV channel), formerly known as Cosmos, a local radio and television station serving Elis, southwestern Greece
 Ultraman Cosmos, a Japanese TV series

Music

Classical
Cosmos, composition for two pianos by Péter Eötvös
"Cosmos", Danish art song by Carl Nielsen

Groups
 Cosmos (band), a Latvian a capella band
 Cosmos, a house music project of DJ Tom Middleton
 Cosmos, a Japanese jazz fusion group featuring Keiko Doi
 Cosmos, a Japanese music duo featuring Sachiko M and Ami Yoshida

Albums

 Cosmos (Lou Donaldson album), 1971
 Cosmos (Sun Ra album), 1977
 Cosmos (McCoy Tyner album), 1977
 Cosmos, a 1981 album by Yuji Ohno
 Cosmos (Buck-Tick album), 1996
 Kosmos, a 1996 album by Valensia
 Cosmos (Zombi album), 2004
 Cosmos (The Send album), 2007
 Cosmos (Rogério Skylab album), 2020
  Cosmos (B.I's second studio album), 2021

Songs
 Cosmos (Antic Cafe song), a Japanese song by An Cafe
"Cosmos", a 1995 song by the band Glide
"Cosmos", song by Open Space (band)
"Kosmos", song by Paul Weller from his eponymous album Paul Weller
 "Cosmos", a 2021 song from B.I's second studio album,  Cosmos

Companies
 Cos.Mo.S, an Italian firm who made swimmer delivery vehicles for frogmen to ride
 Cosmos, a coach company, part of Globus family of brands
 Cosmos Books, an imprint of Wildside Press
 Cosmos Holidays, UK independent tour operator
 Kosmos (company), a Norwegian shipping company
 Kosmos (publisher), a publisher of books, toys and games
 Kosmos Airlines, a Russian airline
 Kosmos Energy, an oil company
 Cosmos (Indonesian Company), an Electronic appliances company

Computing and technology
 Azure Cosmos DB, a database by Microsoft, previously called DocumentDB
 Cosmos (operating system)
 COSMOS (telecommunications), a distribution frame record-keeping system
 COS/MOS, a family of integrated circuits 
 COSMOS, a molecular modelling software package
 Cosmos, developer of a database based on the Pick operating system

Sport
 New York Cosmos (1970–85), an American soccer club based in New York City
 New York Cosmos (2010), an American soccer club based in New York City
 AM Cosmos Ljubljana, a Slovenian football club from 1992 to 1993; since renamed to NK Ljubljana
 Canberra Cosmos FC, a former Australian football based in Canberra
 Cosmos de Bafia, a Cameroonian football club based in Bafia
 Jomo Cosmos F.C., a South African football club based in Johannesburg
 OR Tambo Cosmos, a South African football club based in Mthatha
 S.S. Cosmos, a Sanmarinese football club
 Umbelebele Jomo Cosmos F.C., a Swazi football club based in Mbabane

Other uses
 Cosmos (category theory), a complete and cocomplete symmetric closed monoidal category in mathematics
 Cosmos (plant), a genus of plants in the daisy family
 Cosmos (standard), certification requirements for organic and natural cosmetics in Europe
 COSMOS cohort study, a medical investigation of mobile phone health risks
 Atari Cosmos, a game system
 California State Summer School for Mathematics and Science
 International Cosmos Prize
 USC&GS Cosmos, an American survey ship

See also
 Cosmic (disambiguation)
 Cosmo (disambiguation)